Sharon Kay Ritchie (born January 12, 1937) was Miss America in 1956.

Early life
Ritchie spent her childhood in Grand Island, Nebraska, but hailed from Denver and was later crowned Miss Colorado 1955.

Personal life
Ritchie was previously married to singer/golfer Don Cherry; former football player and sportscaster Kyle Rote; and E. F. Hutton & Co. chairman Robert M. Fomon. She has two children from her marriage to Cherry.

She has been married to Terry Mullin since 1992.

References

1937 births
Miss America 1950s delegates
Miss America winners
Living people
People from Grand Island, Nebraska